Metta Spencer  (born 29 August 1931) is a Canadian sociologist, writer, peace researcher, and activist.

Biography
After completing a Ph.D. in Sociology in 1969 at the University of California, Berkeley, Spencer joined the Department of Sociology at the University of Toronto’s Erindale College in 1971. She taught regularly in the university’s Peace and Conflict Studies Program, which she founded in 1989 and coordinated until her retirement in 1997. In 1976 Spencer authored the Foundations of Modern Sociology textbook, which was subsequently published in four American and seven Canadian editions.

Spencer has specialized in peace and war studies, and has been active in the Canadian peace movement. As the founding president and director of the Canadian Disarmament Information Service (CANDIS), she published the monthly Peace Calendar from 1983 to 1985, when the publication changed to magazine format and took the name Peace Magazine. In 2009, Spencer organized the Zero Nuclear Weapons public forum in Toronto, jointly sponsored by four major Canadian peace organizations with which she has been involved since the mid-80s: Physicians for Global Survival, Canadian Voice of Women for Peace, the Nobel Peace Prize laureate organization Pugwash Conferences on Science and World Affairs, and Science for Peace.

She has also extensively researched peace and conflict in the former Soviet Union and Eastern Europe. In 1997, she organized "The Lessons of Yugoslavia," a three-day Science for Peace conference at the University of Toronto. In 2011, she published The Russian Quest for Peace and Democracy, the culmination of 28 years of research and hundreds of interviews with Russian politicians and activists. She argues that Western peace activists' influence on Russians including Gorbachev helped end the Cold War more so than pressure from the US or NATO.

More recently, Spencer has become involved in climate change activism (by chairing since 2007 a Science for Peace committee to study and campaign for carbon taxation policy) and has researched edutainment, or social change through storytelling. In her book Two Aspirins and a Comedy: How Television Can Enhance Health and Society (2006), she argues that television could be a force for health and social change.

Awards 
 Confederation Medal awarded by Governor-General for Service to Canada, 1992
 Global Citizen Award, United Nations, 1995
 United Nations Association in Canada Award, 1999

Books 
 Adolescent Prejudice (Co-author with Charles Y. Glock, Robert Wuthnow, and Jane Piliavin). New York: Harper and Row, 1975. 
 Foundations of Modern Sociology. Englewood Cliffs, N.J.: Prentice-Hall, 1976. (published in four American and seven Canadian editions)
 Two Aspirins and a Comedy: How Television Can Enhance Health and Society. Boulder, Colorado: Paradigm Publishers, 2006.
 The Russian Quest for Peace and Democracy. Lanham, Maryland: Lexington Press, 2010.

Books edited 
 Research in Social Movements, Conflict, and Change, Vol. 13. Greenwich, Connecticut: JAI Press, 1991.
 World Security: The New Challenge (Co-editor with Carl G. Jacobsen, Morris Miller, and Eric Tollefson). Pugwash Canada. Toronto: Dundurn, 1994.
 Women in Post-Communism: Research on Russia and Eastern Europe, Vol. 2 (Co-editor with Barbara Wejnert, with the assistance of Slobodan Drakulic). Greenwich, Connecticut: JAI Press, 1997. 
 Separatism: Democracy and Disintegration. Lanham, Maryland: Rowman and Littlefield, 1998.
 The Lessons of Yugoslavia: Research on Russia and Eastern Europe, Vol. 3. Amsterdam, London: JAI Press, Elsevier, 2000.

References

External links 
 Website
 Author-owned promotional site for The Russian Quest for Peace and Democracy
 Author-owned promotional site for Two Aspirins and a Comedy
 Peace Magazine
 Archive of audio and video files and position papers from the Zero Nuclear Weapons forum
 Website of the International Peace Bureau
 Metta Spencer archival papers held at the University of Toronto Archives and Records Management Services

1931 births
Living people
Canadian sociologists
Canadian women sociologists
Canadian anti–nuclear weapons activists
Nonviolence advocates
University of California, Berkeley alumni
Academic staff of the University of Toronto
Place of birth missing (living people)